Lewis Williams (February 1, 1782 – February 23, 1842) was a U.S. Congressman from North Carolina between 1815 and 1842.

Born in Surry County, North Carolina (present-day Forsyth County), Williams attended the University of North Carolina at Chapel Hill, graduating in 1808. He was first elected to the North Carolina House of Commons in 1812, serving for a single term (1813-1814) before being elected to the 14th United States Congress as a (Jeffersonian) Republican in 1814.

Williams was re-elected to successive Congresses before his death in 1842. In keeping with the turbulent times in which the parties realigned, he served under five different party labels: as a Republican, as a Crawford Republican, as a supporter of John Quincy Adams, as an "Anti-Jacksonian," and finally as a Whig. During his time in Congress, he chaired the Committee on Claims in the 15th through 21st Congresses, and the Committee on Territories during the 23rd Congress. Williams also introduced the resolution creating the United States House Committee on Agriculture. He died in Washington, DC, while in office in 1842 and is buried in Panther Creek Cemetery near Lewisville, North Carolina.

Williams is the brother of Robert Williams, a U.S. Congressman from North Carolina, and John Williams, a U.S. Senator from Tennessee.

See also
List of United States Congress members who died in office (1790–1899)

References

1782 births
1842 deaths
Members of the North Carolina House of Representatives
University of North Carolina at Chapel Hill alumni
North Carolina National Republicans
North Carolina Whigs
Democratic-Republican Party members of the United States House of Representatives from North Carolina
National Republican Party members of the United States House of Representatives
Whig Party members of the United States House of Representatives
19th-century American politicians
People from Forsyth County, North Carolina
Deans of the United States House of Representatives